Gibralter Hill (also known as Gibraltar Hill) is a hill near Grahamstown, New South Wales, Australia.

Gold mining
In one week in April, 1864, almost 550 ounces of gold were mined from Gibralter Hill, a yield of more than 58 ounces per ton of ore. In 1893 the Gibraltar Gold Mining Company exhibited gold ore from the hill at the World's Columbian Exposition in Chicago yielding a net of 6 ounces of gold per ton.

In 1894 the Gibraltar Hill Company took 656 tons of ore from the hill, which yielded 2090 ounces of gold. In 1895 more than 1500 ounces of gold were mined from the hill by the Gibraltar Gold Mining Company, although by this time the yield was down to less than 5 ounces per ton of ore.

See also

 Gibraltar Hill (disambiguation)
 Mount Gibraltar

References

Mountains of New South Wales
Hills of New South Wales
Gold mining in New South Wales
Gold mines in New South Wales